John Zinser (born February 21, 1967) is a former professional American football player and coach. He attended college at the University of Pennsylvania.

College career
He was named to Div. I-AA All-American and All-Ivy League team in 1988. He played both offensive and defensive linemen.

Professional career
In 1989, Zinser attended training camp with the Philadelphia Eagles.

Zinser spent nine seasons in the Arena Football League for seven teams.

In 1991 John was a member of the Albany Firebirds. He played for the Arizona Rattlers for the '92 and '93 season. Also he in the 1993 season he played for the Miami Hooters. In the 1994 season he again changed uniforms and played for the Massachusetts Marauders. He was later signed by the Charlotte Rage and stayed there for two seasons. In 1997, he was on the New Jersey Red Dogs. The Grand Rapids Rampage signed him for the 1998 season and was resigned in 1999.

Coaching career
In 2000 Zinser became a member of the Grand Rapids Rampage Coaching Staff. He was the line coach for the New Jersey Gladiators (2001) and the Mohegan Wolves (2003). In 2004, he was the offensive coordinator for the Philadelphia Soul. In 2006, he was the offensive coordinator, line coach and player personnel director for the Las Vegas Gladiators. In 2008, he was named to the Columbus Destroyers coaching staff.

References

Philadelphia Eagles players
Albany Firebirds players
Arizona Rattlers players
Miami Hooters players
Massachusetts Marauders players
Charlotte Rage players
New Jersey Red Dogs players
Grand Rapids Rampage players
Grand Rapids Rampage coaches
Penn Quakers football players
Manchester Wolves coaches
Cleveland Gladiators coaches
Philadelphia Soul coaches
Columbus Destroyers coaches
Las Vegas Gladiators coaches
Living people
1967 births